Khosrow Soltan Armani, also known as Khosrow Khan (died 1653), was a 17th-century Safavid official, military commander, and gholam of Armenian origin. He held numerous posts at various times. First, he served as the prefect of the Bakhtiari tribe for a lengthy period (darughah-ye il-e Bakhtiyar). Then, he served as a steward of the Javanshir tribe in Karabagh (hakem-e il-e Javanshir). Later, he held the post of "master of the hunt" (mīr shekār-bāshi) and was given the governorship of Abhar (Soltaniyeh). Lastly, he also served as the governor (beglarbeg) of Shirvan from 1643 to 1653. During his governorship in Shirvan, Khosrow participated in the successful Safavid offensive during the Russo-Persian War of 1651–1653, which resulted in the Russian fortress on the Iranian side of the Terek River being destroyed and its garrison expelled.

To denote that he was a convert, in the then contemporary sources Khosrow was referred to as being "new to Islam" (jadid ol-eslam). His sons Allahverdi Khan (not to be mistaken with the Georgian Allahverdi Khan) and Emamverdi Beg would hold several influential positions as well.

Sources
 
 
 
  
  
 
 
 

1653 deaths
Safavid governors of Shirvan
Persian Armenians
Safavid ghilman
Ethnic Armenian Shia Muslims
Converts to Shia Islam from Christianity
History of Zanjan Province
Safavid governors
Safavid generals
Armenian former Christians
Masters of the hunt of the Safavid Empire
17th-century people of Safavid Iran
Safavid slaves